The FIS Freestyle Ski and Snowboarding World Championships 2015 ski halfpipe competition was held at Kreischberg, Austria on January 21 (qualifying)  and January 22 (finals).

The following are the results of the qualification.

Final
The following are the results of the finals.

References

ski halfpipe, men's